Green Island is located in eastern Newfoundland off the east coast of the Bonavista Peninsula near the entrance to Catalina Harbour. The nearest town is Port Union.

Lighthouse
A lighthouse on Green Island was established in 1857, and a foghorn was added in 1883. The lighthouse keepers were the entire population of the island which was reported for most of the 19th century and up until that of 1935.

See also

List of lighthouses in Canada

References

Islands of Newfoundland and Labrador